Theodore Eugene Hazelwood (April 25, 1924 – February 27, 2005) was an American football offensive tackle in the National Football League for the Washington Redskins.  Hazelwood also played in the All-America Football Conference for the Chicago Hornets.  He played college football at the University of North Carolina. He played high school football for Frankfort High School in Indiana.

American football offensive tackles
North Carolina Tar Heels football players
Chicago Hornets players
Washington Redskins players
People from Fountain County, Indiana
1924 births
2005 deaths